The 2006 M&M Meat Shops Canadian Junior Curling Championships were held at the Fort William Curling Club and the Port Arthur Curling Club in Thunder Bay, Ontario from January 21 to 29. The winning teams represented Canada at the 2006 World Junior Curling Championships.

Men's

Teams

Standings

Results

Draw 1

Draw 2

Draw 3

Draw 4

Draw 5

Draw 6

Draw 7

Draw 8

Draw 9

Draw 10

Draw 11

Draw 12

Draw 13

Playoffs

Semifinal

Final

Women's

Teams

Standings

Results

Draw 1

Draw 2

Draw 3

Draw 4

Draw 5

Draw 6

Draw 7

Draw 8

Draw 9

Draw 10

Draw 11

Draw 12

Draw 13

Playoffs

Tiebreaker

Semifinal

Final

Qualification

Ontario
The Teranet Ontario Junior Curling Championships were held January 4-8 at the Tam Heather Curling & Tennis Club in Toronto.

Lisa Farnell of Peterborough defeated Laura Payne from the Prescott Curling Club 5-3 in the women's final. Payne had beaten the Brit O'Neill rink from the Glendale club in Hamilton 5-4 in the semifinals. Payne made it to the semis by defeating Laura Hickey of Toronto's Avonlea club, 9-2 in a tiebreaker.  

In the men's final, Codey Maus out of the Dixie Club in Mississauga defeated Mike Anderson of Guelph 9-5. Anderson had beaten Chris Gardner from the Carleton Heights club in Ottawa 7-4 in the semifinal.

External links
Women's statistics
Men's statistics

References

Canadian Junior Curling Championships
Canadian Junior Curling Championships
Sports competitions in Thunder Bay
Curling in Northern Ontario
Canadian Junior Curling Championships
January 2006 sports events in Canada